Radoslaw Trojan (born November 28, 1992) is a Polish male acrobatic gymnast. With partners Jakub Kosowicz, Wojciech Krysiak and Tomasz Antonowicz, Trojan achieved 6th in the 2014 Acrobatic Gymnastics World Championships.

References

External links
 

1992 births
Living people
Polish acrobatic gymnasts
Male acrobatic gymnasts
Place of birth missing (living people)